Operation Bowery was an Anglo-American operation in World War II to deliver Spitfire fighter aircraft to Malta ("Club Runs"). The aircraft were desperately needed to bolster the island's defence against strong Axis air raids.

Background
The operation was substantially a repeat of the earlier Operation Calendar, in which the American aircraft carrier  had flown off 48 British Spitfire fighter reinforcements to Malta. Aircraft, support personnel and airfields had inadequately prepared to receive the Spitfires and the Axis air forces were forewarned of the arrival of the new fighters. Many of the Spitfires had been destroyed on the ground by air attacks after their arrival on Malta. A repeat delivery (Operation Bowery) had been planned and its success had become even more important to the Allies.

Bowery

USS Wasp returned to Glasgow on 29 April 1942, where she loaded 47 Spitfires Mk Vc at King George V dock at Shieldhall. The condition of the aircraft was no better than it had been for Calendar; the essential long-range fuel tanks still fitted badly and, consequently, leaked. Wasps captain, Reeves, refused to continue loading until the fault had been fixed on some tanks and then agreed to perform the remaining work with his own personnel. This fault had been notified to the British authorities as it had affected Calendar and its recurrence was a serious embarrassment.

Wasp and her escorting force (Force W) sailed from Scapa Flow on 3 May. On 9 May 1942, 64 Spitfires were flown off USS Wasp and HMS Eagle (61 arrived). One aircraft and its pilot was lost on takeoff.

The minelayer turned transport   had been risked on a high speed run to Malta, carrying, apart from food and general stores, 100 spare Merlin aircraft engines and RAF ground crews trained on Spitfires. She was disguised as a French destroyer (Léopard) and travelled independently of the main Bowery force. Welshman was intercepted and inspected twice by German aircraft but maintained a peaceful appearance and was accepted as non-belligerent; a Vichy seaplane and shore station were less easily convinced but she continued to Cape Bon and Pantelleria, finally reaching Malta at sunrise on 10 May. She unloaded amidst the mayhem of the 10 May air raid (see below) and was damaged by falling debris. Despite this, she left Valletta on the same evening, arriving back at Gibraltar on 12 May.

Aftermath
On Malta, lessons had been learnt from the disaster of Operation Calendar and detailed preparations had been made to get the Spitfires airborne before they could become targets. On arrival, aircraft were dispersed into protected areas and rapidly refuelled and rearmed - one within six minutes of landing - and the newly arrived fighters were airborne, with fresh pilots, over Malta awaiting the air raid intended to destroy them. An Italian formation (CANT Z.1007 bombers escorted by MC.202 fighters) was intercepted with 47 aircraft claimed destroyed or damaged, for the loss of three British. This air battle (sometimes dubbed the "Battle of Malta") abruptly ended daytime bombing of Malta.

The defenders, further reinforced by more aircraft deliveries during May and June and aided by the transfer of Luftwaffe aircraft to Russia, retained their initiative thereafter.

Notes

References

Battle of the Mediterranean
Malta Convoys
Conflicts in 1942
Naval battles and operations of the European theatre of World War II